The 1983–84 Hellenic Football League season was the 31st in the history of the Hellenic Football League, a football competition in England.

Premier Division

The Premier Division featured 14 clubs which competed in the division last season, along with three new clubs:
Avon Bradford
Rayners Lane, promoted from Division One
Supermarine, promoted from Division One

League table

Division One

Division One featured 13 clubs which competed in the division last season, along with five new clubs:
Bishop's Cleeve, joined from the Gloucestershire Northern Senior League
Kintbury Rangers, joined from the North Berks League
Lambourn Sports, relegated from the Premier Division
Shortwood United, relegated from the Premier Division
Yate Town, joined from the Gloucestershire County League

League table

References

External links
 Hellenic Football League

1983-84
8